In combustion, heat release parameter (or gas expansion parameter) is a dimensionless parameter which measures the amount of heat released by the combustion process. It is defined as

where
 is the burnt gas temperature
 is the unburnt mixture temperature.

In typical combustion process, . For isobaric combustion, using ideal gas law, the parameter can be expressed in terms of density, i.e.,

The ratio of burnt gas to unburnt gas temperature is

See also

Zel'dovich number

References

Combustion
Fluid dynamics
Dimensionless numbers
Dimensionless numbers of chemistry
Dimensionless numbers of fluid mechanics